Zagrad is a place name that may refer to:

Bosnia and Herzegovina
 Zagrad, Velika Kladuša, a village in the Municipality of Velika Kladuša, northwestern Bosnia and Herzegovina

Croatia
 Zagrad, Benkovac, a village in the Municipality of Benkovac, County of Zadar

Macedonia
 Zagrad, Makedonski Brod, a village in Makedonski Brod Municipality, western Macedonia

Montenegro
 Zagrad, Berane Municipality, a village in the Municipality of Berane
 Zagrad, Nikšić, a village in the Municipality of Nikšić

Slovenia
Zagrad, Celje, a former village in central-eastern Slovenia, now part of the town of Celje
Zagrad, Prevalje, a village in the Municipality of Domžale, central Slovenia
Zagrad, Radeče, a village in the Municipality of Kostanjevica na Krki, southeastern Slovenia
Zagrad, Škocjan, a village in the Municipality of Škocjan, southeastern Slovenia
Zagrad pri Otočcu, a village in the Municipality of Dol pri Ljubljani, central Slovenia
Zaboršt pri Šentvidu, a village in the Municipality of Ivančna Gorica, southeastern Slovenia